It's a Man's World is an American comedy-drama television series starring Glenn Corbett which aired on NBC from September 17, 1962, to January 28, 1963.

Plot

Cast 
Glenn Corbett as Wes Macauley
Michael Burns as Howie Macauley
Ted Bessell as Tom-Tom DeWitt
Randy Boone as Vern Hodges

Episodes

Aftermath
After the show was cancelled as of mid-January 1963, Corbett found work almost immediately on the already-airing show Route 66.   Route 66 was thematically similar to It's A Man's World, exploring many of the same issues of American life, particularly the issues of restlessness and idealism.  Corbett began his co-starring role as Lincoln Case on Route 66 in March, 1963.

In 1977, ABC revisited the premise of Its a Mans World with The San Pedro Beach Bums, a 60-minute situation comedy about five young men living together on a houseboat in San Pedro, California. It also was unsuccessful, lasting only ten episodes.

References

External links 
 
It's a Man's World at Television Obscurities

1962 American television series debuts
1963 American television series endings
1960s American comedy-drama television series
Black-and-white American television shows
English-language television shows
NBC original programming
Television series by Universal Television
Television shows set in Washington County, Ohio